Locust Hill, also known as the McGruder Estate, is a historic home located near Brunswick, Chariton County, Missouri. The original section was built about 1860 and enlarged about 1880.  It is a two-story, Second Empire style frame dwelling.  It features a mansard roof faced with red, green, grey and black hexagonal slates and a mansarded cupola over the main entrance.  The interior features wallpapers imported from France in the parlors and pine woodwork. Also on the property are three additional contributing buildings.

It was listed on the National Register of Historic Places in 1980.

References

Houses on the National Register of Historic Places in Missouri
Second Empire architecture in Missouri
Houses completed in 1860
Buildings and structures in Chariton County, Missouri
National Register of Historic Places in Chariton County, Missouri